is a Japanese manga series written and illustrated by Yū Koyama. It was serialized in Shogakukan's Weekly Shōnen Sunday from October 1984 to April 1987. Its chapters were collected in fourteen tankōbon volumes.

Manga
Sprinter is written and illustrated by Yū Koyama. It started in the 1984 46th issue of Shogakukan's Weekly Shōnen Sunday on October 31, 1984, and was his second manga serialized in the magazine after Ganbare Genki. It finished in the 1987 17th issue of the magazine on April 8, 1987. The series was collected into fourteen tankōbon volumes published by Shogakukan, released from April 18, 1985 to May 18, 1987.

Volume list

References

External links 
 Official Shogakukan manga web site 

Shogakukan manga
Shōnen manga